Iceland's first ambassador to Sweden was Helgi P. Briem in 1950. Iceland's current ambassador to Sweden is Hannes Heimisson.

List of ambassadors

See also
Iceland–Sweden relations
Foreign relations of Iceland
Ambassadors of Iceland

References

List of Icelandic representatives (Icelandic Foreign Ministry website) 

1950 establishments in Iceland
Main
Sweden
Iceland